Francisco Ortega may refer to:

 Francisco Ortega (bishop) (died 1602), Roman Catholic prelate
 Francisco Ortega (footballer, born 1996), Argentine defender for Atlético de Rafaela
 Francisco Ortega (footballer, born 1999), Argentine midfielder for Club Atlético Vélez Sarsfield
 Francisco Ortega (writer) (born 1974), Chilean writer
 Francisco Ortega III, Filipino politician
 Francisco Robles Ortega (born 1949), Mexican prelate of the Catholic Church